List of longest Croatian words contains some of the longest words in Croatian. This list does not include words for large numbers.

One of the longe words in Croatian is prijestolonasljednica which means 'a female throne successor'.

List
This list contains words in Croatian with at least 10 letters. Some of words in this list come from Latin and Greek.

References

External links
 Koliko uopće poznajemo hrvatski jezik? - Manjgura.hr
 Hrvatski jezični portal - Novi Liber

Literature
 Vladimir Anić, Ivo Goldstein: Rječnik stranih riječi, Zagreb, 2004. 

Croatian language